Jocelyn Dela-Cruz (born Philippines) is a Principal Environmental Scientist at the New South Wales Office of Environment and Heritage, Australia. She was educated at the University of Sydney (BSc. Hons1 and MSc) and University of New South Wales (Ph.D.).

Background

Dela-Cruz's background in science is diverse. She started her graduate studies as an eco-physiologist, investigating ion and water regulation and nitrogenous excretion in land crabs on Christmas Island. Jocelyn's interest in protecting the marine environment prompted her to undertake a Ph.D. investigating pollutant impacts on water quality and plankton ecology. Soon after, she moved to the United Kingdom to travel and take up a postdoctoral position at the University of Plymouth. It was here that Jocelyn gained skills in developing catchment models and decision support systems to help identify and quantify sources of diffuse pollution. The modelling approaches that she developed were subsequently used for the European Commission Sixth Framework Programme on European Lifestyles and impacts on Marine Ecosystems (ELME). The objective of ELME was to integrate existing knowledge of environmental state changes, sectoral pressures and social and economic drivers into a common modelling platform to inform decisions and policies in the United Kingdom and Europe.

As of 2014, Dela-Cruz's work ranged from being an expert witness for legal prosecutions, conducting audits, responding to pollution incidents, reviewing acts and regulations, and providing advice to other agencies on environmental impacts. Her main research role at this time was to bring together best available data and develop tools for evidence based decision making.

Publications

Scanes P., Dela-Cruz J. and Ferguson A. (2014). Determining ecologically based targets for stormwater quality. Stormwater Australia Bulletin, 204:2-5.
van der Sterren M., Dela-Cruz J. and Walpole S. (2012). Assessment of water sensitive urban design management scenarios to manage the long-term impacts of developments on a coastal saltwater lake, Proceedings of the 7th International Conference on Water Sensitive Urban Design, 21–23 February 2012, Melbourne.
Dela-Cruz J. (2011). Coastal Eutrophication Risk Assessment Tool. http://www.ozcoasts.gov.au/nrm_rpt/cerat/index.jsp
Roper T., Creese B., Scanes P., Stephens K., Williams R., Dela-Cruz J., Coade G., Coates B. and Fraser M. (2011). Assessing the condition of estuaries and coastal lake ecosystems in NSW. Monitoring, evaluation and reporting program, Technical report series, Office of Environment and Heritage, Sydney. .
Scanes P., Dela-Cruz J., Coade G., Haine B., McSorley A., van den Broek J., Evans L., Kobayashi T. and O'Donnell M. (2011). Aquatic inventory of Nadgee Lake, Nadgee River and Merrica River estuaries. Proceedings of the Linnean Society of New South Wales 132, 169–186.
Dela-Cruz J. (2009). Threat of eutrophication. Wetlands Australia, 17:28.
Littleboy M., Sayers J. and Dela-Cruz J. (2009). Hydrological modelling of coastal catchments in New South Wales. Proceedings of the 18th World IMACS/MODSIM Congress, Cairns, Australia 13–17 July 2009.
Scanes P., Dela-Cruz J., Coade G., Potts J., Haine B., and Carpenter, M. (2008) Protecting estuarine wetlands: Great Lakes Coastal Catchments Initiative. Wetlands Australia, 16:43-45.
Dela-Cruz J., Middleton J. and Suthers I. (2008). The influence of upwelling, coastal currents and water temperature on the distribution of the red tide dinoflagellate, Noctiluca scintillans, along the east coast of Australia. Hydrobiologia, 598:59-75
Dela-Cruz J., Pritchard T., Gordon G. and Ajani P. (2006) The use of periphyton as a means of assessing impacts of point source inorganic nutrient pollution in south-eastern Australia. Freshwater Biology, 51 (5): 951–972.
Jackson E.L., Glanfield S.C., Dela-Cruz J., Langmead O., Arvanitidis C., Attrill M.J., Tyler-Walters H., Mee L. (2006). An objective approach to quantifying loss of seagrass in the Mediterranean: Causal chain analysis and scenario predictions. Biol. Mar. Medit., 13(4): 240–244.
Dela-Cruz J., Macleod C., Haygarth P., Glegg G., Scholefield D. and Mee L. (2003) A decision support tool for international diffuse pollution management. Proceedings of the 7th International Specialised Conference on Diffuse Pollution and Basin Management, 17–22 August, Dublin, Theme 6, pp 146–150. .
Dela-Cruz J., Middleton J. and Suthers I. (2003) Population growth and transport of the red tide dinoflagellate, Noctiluca scintillans, near Sydney Australia, using cell diameter as a tracer. Limnology and Oceanography, 48(2): 656–674.
Dela-Cruz J. (2002). Population dynamics and ecology of the red tide dinoflagellate, Noctiluca scintillans. University of New South Wales. 
Dela-Cruz J., Ajani P., Lee R., Pritchard T. and Suthers I. (2002) Temporal abundance patterns of the red tide dinoflagellate, Noctiluca scintillans, along the south-east coast of Australia. Mar. Ecol. Prog. Ser. 236: 75–88.
Morris S. and Dela-Cruz J. (1998) The ecophysiological significance of lung-air retention during submersion by the air-breathing crabs Cardisoma carnifex and Cardisoma hirtipes. Experimental Biology Online, 3(10): 1-14.
Dela-Cruz L. (1997). Ion and Water Regulation in Cardisoma (Brachyura, Gecarcinidae). University of Sydney.
Dela-Cruz J. and Morris S. (1997) Water and ion balance and nitrogenous excretion as limitations to terrestrial excursion in the Christmas Island blue crab, Cardisoma hirtipes (Dana). J. exp. Zool., 279: 537-548
Dela-Cruz J. and Morris S. (1997) Respiratory, acid-base and metabolic responses of the Christmas Island blue crab, Cardisoma hirtipes, during simulated environmental conditions. Physiol. Zool., 70(1): 100–115.

References

Living people
Australian women scientists
Australian ecologists
Women ecologists
University of Sydney alumni
Year of birth missing (living people)